Discovery Networks CEEMEA (Discovery Networks Central & Eastern Europe, Middle East and Africa) was a branch of Discovery International headquartered in Warsaw, Poland. The network was launched in February 2011, previously Discovery Networks CEEMEA was under Discovery Networks Europe.

Discovery Networks CEEMEA held the responsibility for overseeing Discovery International channels in 105 countries in the Middle East, United Arab Emirates, the Russian Federation, Central Asia, Africa and European countries such as Germany, Greece, Hungary, Poland, Lithuania, Latvia, Estonia, Romania, Bulgaria, Croatia, Czech Republic, Slovakia, Slovenia, Serbia, Turkey, Israel, Macedonia, comprising 10 brands.

History
Discovery Networks CEEMEA started out with the launch of the Discovery Channel in Europe in 1989 and was for a long time a part of Discovery Networks Europe. In mid-2007, Discovery Networks Europe was split into two separate branches, Discovery Networks UK and Discovery Network EMEA, both headquartered in London.

In February 2011, Discovery Networks Europe was split into two key branches Discovery Networks Western Europe (DNWE) and Discovery Networks CEEMEA (Central & Eastern Europe, Middle East and Africa). Discovery Networks CEEMEA's headquarters are in Warsaw, Poland. Regional offices are located in Almaty, Bucharest, Budapest, Kiev, London, Moscow and Prague.

Kasia Kieli is President and Managing Director for Discovery Networks Central & Eastern Europe, Middle East & Africa (CEEMEA) and as strategic management responsibility of Discovery's operations in the region, which became a standalone business in July 2010 and today encompasses 105 countries across three continents. In each of these markets, Discovery broadcasts up to nine channels from a list that includes Discovery Channel, Animal Planet, Discovery Science, Discovery HD Showcase and TLC.

From late 2016 all localised operations fall under the umbrella of Discovery EMEA with headquarters in Amsterdam (Northern and Western Europe), London (United Kingdom), Milan (Southern Europe) and Warsaw (Central & Eastern Europe, Middle East and Africa).

Brands
Some channels listed below may only be available in some territories.

Discovery Channel
Animal Planet
Discovery Science
Discovery Travel & Living
Discovery World
Investigation Discovery
Food Network
HGTV
Travel Channel
Fine Living
Quest Arabiya (Middle East and North Africa)
TLC (Middle East and North Africa)
Discovery Historia (Poland)
Metro (Poland)
DMAX
Fatafeat (Middle East and North Africa)
Discovery Family HD (Middle East and Africa)
DKids (Middle East and North Africa)
DTX (Middle East and North Africa)
DLife (Middle East and North Africa)
Investigation Discovery Xtra (Africa)
 DKids Arabia
 Real Time (Africa)

Regional
In Central and Eastern Europe, the Middle East and Africa, 10 Discovery brands reach 141 million cumulative subscribers in 105 countries with programming customised in 19 languages. (usually subtitled) Arabic, Bulgarian, Croatian, Czech, English, German, Greek, Hebrew, Hungarian, Latvian, Macedonian, Polish, Romanian, Russian, Serbian, Slovak, Slovenian, Turkish. The network is home to 18 different feeds.

References

External links
Discovery Networks CEEMEA at Discovery Communications
Discovery Network Western Europe at Discovery Communications

Entertainment companies established in 1989
Television channels and stations established in 1989
Television networks in Germany
Television networks in Russia
Television networks in Poland
Television networks in Romania